KADY may refer to:

 KADY (Missouri), a former radio station in St. Charles, Missouri, from 1958 to 1965
 KADY-LP, a former TV station in Sherman, Texas
 KBEH, a television station in Garden Grove, California, that used the call letters KADY-TV from 1988 to 2004

See also
 Kady, a village in Poland
 Kady (given name)